Daniel Alcaíno Cuevas (born April 6, 1972) is a Chilean actor and comedian. He is popularly known for his comedy characters Peter Veneno (roughly based in Ivan Zamorano), and Yerko Puchento, an outspoken showbusiness journalist and political satirist. Although he has gain further recognition for dramatic roles as well such as Exequiel Pacheco in Los 80 and Mario Medina in 42 Days of Darkness.

Biography and career 
Born and raised in Santiago, the capital of Chile, he attended the Liceo Cervantes when he was a teenager. After an unsuccessful attempt to study Law, Alcaíno embarked on a career as an actor and comedian, he studied at the Universidad de Chile. 

Alcaíno is also recognized for his character Exequiel Pacheco in Los 80, a series based on the lives of Chilean families during Augusto Pinochet's dictatorship. In August 2011, Alcaíno portrayed Patricio Carmona in Peleles.

In 2022 he portraited Mario Medina in the Netflix crime thriller series 42 Days of Darkness, which is partially based on the true story of the disappearance of Viviana Haeger in 2010, in southern Chile.

References

External links 
 

1972 births
Male actors from Santiago
Living people
Chilean male comedians
Chilean male television actors
University of Chile alumni